Winds of Change is a fantasy novel by American writer Mercedes Lackey. It is the second book in the Mage Winds trilogy, in order between Winds of Fate and Winds of Fury. The book was first released in October 1992.

Synopsis 
Winds of Change is the story telling of the training of the Heir of Valdemar Elspeth in real magic.

1992 American novels
American fantasy novels
Valdemar Universe
DAW Books books